is a subway station on the  Fukuoka City Subway Hakozaki Line in Higashi-ku, Fukuoka in Japan. Its station symbol is the gate(Torii) of the Hakozaki Shrine in grey.

Lines

Platforms

Vicinity
Hakozaki Shrine
 - Kyūshū Railway Company : Kagoshima Main Line
Higashi ward office
Higashi Health Center
Fukuoka Prefectural Library

History
September 12, 1983: Decision to build the Station. Tentative name: Hakozaki station.
January 31, 1986: Opening of the station.

Other
A temporary staffed entrance gate is set up during the Hakozaki Shrine festival.

References

External links
 Fukuoka City Subway station information

Railway stations in Japan opened in 1986
Railway stations in Fukuoka Prefecture
Hakozaki Line